These are all the matches played by the Spain national football team between 2020 and 2029:

Meaning

Results

2020
8 matches played:

2021
18 matches played:

2022
13 matches played:

2023
0 matches played:

Notes

References

External links
Todos los partidos (all the games) at Selección Española de Fútbol (official site) 

2020s in Spanish sport
2020
2019–20 in Spanish football